Ja'far us Sadiq Imaduddin or Jafar us Sadiq Mufaddal Saifuddin, is the eldest son of Mufaddal Saifuddin, the current incumbent of the office of the 53rd Dawoodi Bohra Da'i al-Mutlaq, and the grandson of Mohammed Burhanuddin. He is a poet, scholar and one of the four rectors of Aljamea-tus-Saifiyah.

Education 

 He completed the memorization of the Quran in 1999.
 Al-Faqih al-Jayyid (MA) in Islamic Fatemi Literature, Aljamea-tus-Saifiyah., 1997.
 MA in Arabic literature, ALECSO (Arab League Educational, Cultural and Scientific Organization), 2005.  Thesis title: The Receptionist Theory and the Poetry of  al-Amir Tamim bin Imam Al-Mu'izz li-Din Allah.
 PhD in Arabic Literature, ALECSO (Arab League Educational, Cultural and Scientific Organization), 2013  Research focus: The art and science of dialectic in the works of Syedna al-Mu’ayyad al-Shirazi.

Career 
He is a Senior Fellow at the Royal Aal al-Bayt Institute for Islamic Thought and is also a signatory of the Amman Message, which is a declaration calling for tolerance and unity in the Muslim world that was issued on 9 November 2004 (27th of Ramadan 1425 Hijri) by Abdullah II of Jordan.

He was appointed one of the rectors of Aljamea-tus-Saifiyah on 27 Rajab 1436H corresponding to 15 May 2015 by Mufaddal Saifuddin.

Personal life 
Imaduddin is married to Zaenab (née Nuruddin), daughter of Shabbir Nuruddin bin Taher Saifuddin.

Recognition and awards 
 : On 15 May 2015 at a public gathering in Surat:

 : On 3 May 2016 at a public gathering in Surat, he was conferred two of the highest degrees of Aljamea tus Saifiyah:

Works 
 A literary analysis of the Qasida (Arabic: شب الغرام لهيب خد احمر) by Miya Saheb Wali bhai (Arabic: ميا صاحب ولي بهائي). This work was completed in 1418 Hijri  and is titled (Arabic: شفاء الاوام في قصيدة شب الغرام ).
 During the restoration of Fatimid mosques in Cairo by Syedna Mohammed Burhanuddin, he compiled separate works, in Arabic, on the architectural features of each of the mosques. These works studied Al-Jami' al-Anwar, Al-Jami' al-Aqmar, Al-Jami' al-Juyushi, Al-Jami' al-Lulua and Fatimid gates and fortifications of Cairo.
 Al Aqmar: A Living Testimony to the Fatemiyeen (2000).
 Al Juyushi: A Vision of the Fatemiyeen (2002).
 Arabic: دراسة لشعر الامير تميم من منظور نظرية التلقي. Thesis title: The Receptionist Theory and the Poetry of  al-Amir Tamim bin Imam Al-Mu'izz li-Din Allah.
 Arabic: ادب المناظرة والحجاج في المجالس المؤيدية. Research focus: The art and science of dialectic in the works of Syedna al-Mu’ayyad al-Shirazi.
 Qasida in Urdu: منة كرو عناية ايك قطرة بس عسل كا in 2015.

References

1973 births
Living people
21st-century Muslim scholars of Islam
Dawoodi Bohras